is a Japanese manga series written and illustrated by Yoshinobu Yamada. It has been serialized in Kodansha's seinen manga magazine Weekly Young Magazine since March 2017.

Publication
Satanophany is written and illustrated by Yoshinobu Yamada. The series began in Kodansha's seinen manga magazine Weekly Young Magazine on March 13, 2017. In July 2021, it was announced that the manga had entered its final stage. Kodansha has collected its chapters into individual tankōbon volumes. The first volume was released on June 6, 2017. As of November 4, 2022, twenty-three volumes have been released.

Volume list

See also
Cage of Eden, another manga series by the same author
Deathtopia, another manga series by the same author

References

External links
 

Erotic thriller anime and manga
Kodansha manga
Prisons in anime and manga
Seinen manga